Grenfell Cloth is a densely-woven cotton gabardine material used to make luxury and outdoor clothing since its creation in 1923. It was named after Sir Wilfred Grenfell, a British medical missionary working extensively in Newfoundland. He required a cloth to be woven to protect himself from the snow, wind, wet and cold weather he encountered in his work.

The cloth is made from 600 thread-per-inch cotton originally by T. Haythornthwaite & Sons Ltd at Lodge Mill, Burnley, in the United Kingdom.  It is similar to Byrd Cloth.

After Japanese ownership in the 1980s and 1990s, Grenfell Cloth garments are once again manufactured in Britain.  Grenfell is now based in London.

Usage
Grenfell Cloth has been used on many expeditions.

See also
 Ventile

References

External links
 History of Grenfell manufacture

Woven fabrics
Textile patterns
Products introduced in 1923